Ytri-Rangá is a river in Iceland popular for salmon fishing. The designation Ytri, "outer", distinguished it from the Eystri or East Rangá, an affluent of the Þverá.

References 

Rivers of Iceland